Mafileo "Leo" Koloamatangi (born May 9, 1994) is an American football center who is a free agent. He played college football at Hawaii, and was signed by the Detroit Lions as an undrafted free agent in 2017. He has also been a member of the New York Jets.

Professional career

Detroit Lions
Koloamatangi was signed by the Detroit Lions as an undrafted free agent on May 12, 2017. He was waived on September 2, 2017 and was signed to the practice squad the next day. He signed a reserve/future contract on January 1, 2018.

On September 2, 2018, Koloamatangi was waived by the Lions and re-signed to the practice squad. He was promoted to the active roster on December 11, 2018.

On August 31, 2019, Koloamatangi was waived by the Lions.

New York Jets
On October 30, 2019, Koloamatangi was signed to the New York Jets practice squad. He was promoted to the active roster on November 16, 2019.

Koloamatangi re-signed with the Jets on April 23, 2020. On July 28, 2020, he opted out of the 2020 season due to the COVID-19 pandemic. He was waived after the season on May 7, 2021.

References

External links
Hawaii Rainbow Warriors bio

1994 births
Living people
American football centers
Hawaii Rainbow Warriors football players
Detroit Lions players
New York Jets players